The Internet in South Africa, one of the most technologically resourced countries on the African continent, is expanding. The Internet country code top-level domain (ccTLD) .za is managed and regulated by the .za Domain Name Authority (.ZADNA) and was granted to South Africa by the Internet Corporation for Assigned Names and Numbers (ICANN) in 1990. Over 60% of Internet traffic generated on the African continent originates from South Africa. As of 2020, 41.5 million people (70.00% of the total population) were Internet users.

History 

The first South African IP address was granted to Rhodes University in 1988. On 12 November 1991, the first IP connection was made between Rhodes' computing centre and the home of Randy Bush in Portland, Oregon. By November 1991, South African universities were connected through UNINET to the Internet. Commercial Internet access for businesses and private use began in June 1992 with the registration of the first .co.za subdomain. The African National Congress, South Africa's governing political party, launched its website, in 1997, making it one of the first African political organizations to establish an Internet presence; around the same time, the Freedom Front Plus registered .

Statistics

The Internet user base in South Africa increased from 2.4 million (5.35%) in 2000, to 5 million (8.43%) in 2008, to 12.3 million (41%) in 2012, and 29.3 million in 2016. This represented 54.00% of the South African population in 2016. This is the highest penetration for all African countries second to Morocco (58.27%), is well above the figure of 19.9% for Africa as a whole, and is comparable with the figure of 39.0% for developing countries worldwide.

The total number of wireless broadband subscribers overtook that of fixed line broadband subscribers in South Africa during 2007. In 2012, there were 1.1 million fixed line broadband subscribers and 12.7 million wireless broadband subscribers.

South Africa's total international bandwidth reached the 10 Gbit/s mark during 2008, and its continued increase is being driven primarily by the uptake of broadband and lowering of tariffs.  Three new submarine cable projects have brought more capacity to South Africa from 2009—the SEACOM cable entered service in June 2009, the EASSy cable in July 2010, and the WACS cable in May 2012. Additional international cable systems have been proposed or are under construction (for details see active and proposed cable systems below).

Broadband

Dial up Internet

Dial-up subscribers are migrating to broadband, and then escalating to higher-bandwidth packages as they become available.
However, broadband technologies are not universally available and many customers still connect to the Internet using a dial-up modem or an ISDN T/A connection.

There was also BelTel - a (mostly business) service available via subscription. It could be used via Minitel terminals, and gave access to banking services, Telkom directory services, and local chat groups.

ADSL
The First true ADSL solution for Consumers was branded "Turbo Access". Turbo Access was a Tender awarded to Africa Data Holdings. Solutioins ranged from a Basic Rate Liine (2 x 64-kbit/s B channels and one 16-kbit/s D channel). Most home users had a 64kbit/s Internet connection, utilising the second B Channel for telephony. Larger businesses took advantage of Primary Rate ISDN (The T1 line consists of 23 bearer (B) channels and one data (D) channel for control purposes) for common needs like switchbaords and Fax solutions. The ISDN Terminal Adapters were all supplied by Eicon Networks Corporation which was bought by Dialogic Corp. This was the very first introduction of "Broadband" into South Africa, and a platform for growth. Utilising ISDN, WAN Africa Data Holdings (later dissolved into the Converge Grioup) inroduced (at the time), many revolutionary solutions like fax, Unified Messaging (email, fax,voicemail), Remote Access Service (RAS), and Voice over IP.

In late 2009, Telkom began trialling 8 and 12 Mbit/s ADSL offerings. In August 2010, Telkom officially introduced ADSL at 10 Mbit/s. More than 20,000 4Mbit/s subscribers were upgraded free of charge. As of October 2018, fixed line DSL speeds on offer range between 2 Mbit/s to 40 Mbit/s.

ADSL Pricing 
ADSL prices in South Africa have been decreasing steadily since the service was introduced, mainly as a result of competition from mobile network operators, but also due to the landing of the SEACOM cable. Previously the sole undersea cable to land in South Africa was the Telkom-operated SAT-3. Telkom's own ADSL subscriber base climbed from 58,532 in February 2005 to around 548,015 in July 2009. ADSL broadband prices began to drop significantly when Afrihost entered the market at R29 ($) per gigabyte in August 2009, forcing other ISPs to lower their prices. Since then, thanks to more ISPs entering the market, the price for data has decreased – in February 2014, Webafrica started offering ADSL from R1.50 ($) per GB. However, relative to developed markets, ADSL prices in South Africa still remain among the highest in the world which has prompted consumer groups such as Hellkom and MyADSL to charge that Telkom's ADSL prices are excessive. In terms of speed, a report by Akamai, The State of the Internet for 2010, showed that South Africa was one of 86 countries which had an average connection speed below 1 Mbit/s, which is below the global average broadband threshold of 2 Mbit/s.

Fibre to the home (FTTH)
Currently, deployed fibre technology is predominantly by GPON is Openserve, Vumatel, Frogfoot networks and Octotel. There is no central coordinating authority; as a result, many high-income areas are over-served by multiple providers

There are also about a dozen other small providers rolling out mostly to gated estates and neighbourhoods. These networks are open access wholesale last mile networks meaning that you have to purchase a package from an internet service provider (ISP) such as Vox, Webafrica, Axxess, or Telkom (Openserve). Speeds range from 10/10 Mbit/s to 1000/1000 Mbit/s. A 100/50 Mbit/s plan will cost R799 to R999 (US$ to $) depending on providers available in area and size of data package. A unlimited full Gigabit plan will cost around R1700 ($) so prices are still reasonable compared to other countries with FTTH.

Fibre Pricing 
There are over 15 fibre networks in South Africa and the pricing is not standardised across all networks for the same packages in terms of speed and data allowance. With increased competition between the fibre networks and ISPs, the cost of fibre has decreased substantially, with some deals currently as low as R19 for the first month of signing up. 

The three biggest fibre networks in South Africa have the following average pricing for 50Mbit/s Uncapped according to the popular fibre and LTE price comparison website FibreTiger.co.za

Wireless 

There is a distinction between wireless broadband and mobile broadband, the local GSM operators (and their surrogates) provide GSM (up to LTE) broadband.

A number of companies offer broadband alternatives. Iburst offer their namesake, while cellular network company Cell C offer GPRS and EDGE and more recently a 21.1 Mbit/s service. MTN and Vodacom also offer 3G with up to 21.1 Mbit/s HSDPA+. Telkom offers a 7.2/2.4 Mbit/s HSDPA/HSUPA service in Gauteng. Most of these offerings are more expensive than ADSL for mid-to-high usage, but can be cost effective if low usage is required. MTN triggered a price war in late February 2007, offering 2 GB for each 1 GB bought, with Iburst giving a small "data bonus" to their contract customers and Sentech also reducing their prices. Vodacom responded with dramatic price cuts of their own on 1 April 2007, after which Cell C reduced prices on their larger offerings to undercut both MTN and Vodacom.

Internet hotspots are ubiquitous in hotels, coffee shops, and the like. This enables users—often tourists or people on the move—to easily go online without having to enter into a fixed contract with an ISP. Many hotspots offer usage free of charge, though frequently only after registration and/or for a limited amount of time or data.

Voice over Internet Protocol (VoIP) 
Until 1 February 2005, the usage of VoIP outside of company networks was illegal under South African communications law, ostensibly to protect jobs. The deregulation of VoIP was announced by former Minister of Communications Ivy Matsepe-Casaburri in September 2004.

1G 
1G used to be offered by Vodacom, MTN, Cell C and Telkom. Since then all 1G cell towers in South Africa have been repurposed as 2G, 3G, 4G or 5G infrastructure or decommissioned.

2G 
South Africa offers GSM 900 and GSM 1800 with almost 99.9% coverage. So far Vodacom has shown interest in turning off their 2G network, but it is still operating today

3G 
South Africa offers UMTS 900 and UMTS 2100 with 99.7% of the population having coverage.

4G/LTE 
South Africa offers LTE 1800, LTE 2100 and LTE 2300, from MTN, Vodacom, Cell C, Telkom and Rain.

LTE Coverage by carrier 2020

5G 
So far, Vodacom and MTN both have launched 5G 3500 in Johannesburg and Cape Town. with MTN having the widest and most 5G coverage in the country.

Providers

Cellular Providers

MTN 
MTN Group Limited, formerly M-Cell, is a South African   telecommunications company, based in Johannesburg. As of 2020, MTN recorded over 31 million subscribers in South Africa MTN is Active in over 20 countries, most in Africa.

MTN South Africa provides 2G, 3G, 4G, LTE and 5G networks in South Africa. They also offer FTTH services and were the first provider in Africa to launch 5G. Currently they have the widest 5G coverage on the continent.

Vodacom 
Vodacom Group Limited (operating as Vodacom) is a South African mobile communications company, providing service to over 55 million customers. Founded in South Africa, Vodacom has grown its operations to include networks in 32 other African countries.

Vodacom South Africa provides 2G,3G, 4G, and UMTS networks in South Africa. They also offers HSPA+ (21.1 Mbit/s), HSUPA (42 Mbit/s, 2100 MHz), Wi-Fi, WiMAX, and LTE services.

Vodacom was the first cellular provider to introduce LTE in South Africa and on 7 April 2017, Vodacom's 4G+ network in Brooklyn Mall, Pretoria achieved 240 Mbit/s in a speed test.

In late 2020 Vodacom also became the second network operator in Africa to publicly launch a live 5G network, initially available in Johannesburg, Pretoria and Cape Town.

Cell C 
Cell C Limited (stylised as Cell ©) is a telecommunications mobile operator in South Africa. They offer 2G,3G,4G and LTE services After recently going bankrupt, Cell C has decided to merge all their customers with both MTN and Vodacom.

Telkom Mobile 
Telkom Limited is a South African telecommunications provider, operating in more than 38 countries across Africa. Telkom is majority-privatised with it being 39% state-owned. Telkom mobile, previously 8.ta offers 2G,3G, 4G and LTE services

Rain 
Rain (Pty) Ltd is a telecommunications provider in South Africa, providing data only services to consumers in South Africa. They offer 4G and LTE mobile services as well as 5G mobile services

Other 
Other minor providers include FNB Connect, Virgin Mobile, me&you mobile, Cashless CF and MRP Mobile. They all offer 2G,3G, 4G and LTE services through the use of other telecommunication companies infrastructure.

Fiber Infrastructure Providers

OpenServe 
OpenServe is a licensed telecommunications service providers through an open-access network. They are majority owned by state owned Telkom.  They provide broadband services to over 3 million households and having laid over 147,000 kilometres of fibre optic cables in South Africa.

Vumatel 
Vumatel is an Open Access Fibre Provider, that specialize in building Fibre networks. They are majority owned by Remgro and provide Fibre to the Home(FTTH) services in South Africa.

Frogfoot 
Frogfoot is an Open Access Fiber Provider, that specializes in building fiber networks. They currently provide fiber to over 102,000 homes in South Africa.

Octotel 
Octotel is an Open Access Fibre Provider, that specialises in building Fibre Optic Networks. They provide fibre connectivity to over 100,000 homes and businesses across South Africa, with a strong presence in Cape Town.

MetroFibre 
MetroFibre is a carrier class Ethernet (CE 3.0) infrastructure company, that today provides highly managed fibre optic broadband connectivity in South Africa. Their Customers include Internet Service Providers (ISPs), resellers, residential and business properties.

Others 
There are many other Open Access Fiber Provider, with major others including Link Africa, SADV and Evotel. They also provide FTTH infrastructure to people in South Africa.

Internet Service Providers 

There are over 150 registered ISPs in South Africa Registered with ISPA

Fiber Optic Cable Systems

Background 
Fiber Optic cables land at multiple points in South Africa.

Mtunzini 

 SEACOM/Tata TGN-Eurasia
 2Africa
 Africa1
 Eastern Africa Submarine System (EASSy)
 PEACE
 SAex2
 SAFE
 SAex

Umbogintwini 

 Meltingpot Indianoceanic Submarine System (METISS)

East London 

 IOx

Port Elizabeth 

 2Africa

Cape Town 

 2Africa
 SAex2
 PEACE

Melkbosstrand 

 SAFE
 SAT-2
 Equiano
 BRICS Cable
 SAT-3/WASC

Duynefontein 

 Africa Coast to Europe (ACE)

Yzerfontein 

 West African Cable System (WACS)
 SAex

Active Cables Systems 
South Atlantic 3/West Africa Submarine Cable/South Africa Far East (SAT-3/WASC/SAFE): SAT-3/WASC, a 14,350 km-long 340 Gbit/s cable system, became operational in 2001, providing the first links to Europe for West African and South African Internet users, taking up service from SAT-2 which was reaching maximum capacity. The SAFE cable system, a 13,500 km-long 440 Gbit/s system, was commissioned in 2002 and links South Africa to the Asian continent, with landing points at India and Malaysia.
 SEACOM: The SEACOM submarine cable landing at Mombasa, entered commercial service in June 2009. The cable runs from South Africa to Egypt via Mozambique, Madagascar, Tanzania, Kenya, Djibouti and Saudi Arabia, connecting eastwards through to India and westwards through the Mediterranean. It initially operated at 640 Gbit/s in 2009, was upgraded to 2.6 Tbit/s in 2012, with further upgrades during 2013.
 East African Submarine Cable System (EASSy): The EASSy cable system entered service during July 2010. The 4.72 Tbit/s system runs from South Africa (Mtunzini) to Egypt via Mombasa (Kenya) and other African Great Lakes countries. The cable runs as far north as Djibouti and Port Sudan in Northeast Africa, with onward connectivity to Europe provided by the Europe India Gateway (EIG) cable. In March 2007, a 23-member consortium behind EASSy signed a supply contract with Alcatel-Lucent which led to the construction of the cable.
 West African Cable System (WACS): The WACS is a 14,000 km-long cable that provides 5.12 Tbit/s of bandwidth between South Africa, 11 other West African countries, Portugal, and the United Kingdom. In April 2009, the WACS consortium signed a construction and maintenance agreement in April 2009 and the cable became operational in May 2012.

Proposed Cable Systems
The following systems have been proposed or are under construction, but are not yet operational in South Africa:
 
Main One: The Main One cable system, a 14,000 km-long system with a capacity of 1.92 Tbit/s, is being delivered in two phases. The first phase linked Ghana and Nigeria to Portugal and became operational in July 2010. Phase two of the project will provide additional Internet capacity to South Africa and other countries on the west African coast.
ACE (Africa Coast to Europe): The ACE cable system is a 17,000 km-long submarine cable capable of supporting an overall potential capacity of 5.12Tbit/s using wavelength division multiplexing (WDM) technology. When complete it will connect 23 countries either directly for coastal countries or indirectly through terrestrial links for landlocked countries, such as Mali and Niger. The first phase of the system was put into service on 15 December 2012. ACE is expected to reach South Africa in 2013.
SAex (South Atlantic Express): The SAex cable is a proposed submarine communications cable which would link South Africa and Angola to Brazil with onward connectivity to the United States that will connect to the existing GlobeNet cable system. The project was announced in 2011 following a BRICS summit and a memorandum of understanding signed by its members. The project, if realized, will enable the shortest route possible to the Americas reducing latency and bandwidth costs. Currently, America bound South Africa Internet traffic routes through Europe, incurring the said latency and bandwidth costs. If constructed, the cable will have the largest design capacity (12.8 Tbit/s) of any other cable servicing the African continent.
BRICS Cable: A proposed 34,000 km-long, 12.8 Tbit/s capacity, fibre optic cable system that would link Russia, China, India, South Africa, Brazil (the BRICS economies), and the United States as well as interconnecting regional and other continental cable systems in Asia, Africa, and South America for improved global coverage. Target date for completion is mid to late 2015.
WASACE: WASACE Cable is a proposed 29,000 km-long, 40 to 60 Tbit/s capacity, fibre optic cable system. When complete it would link four continents (South Africa to Nigeria via Angola, Nigeria to Brazil, Brazil to the United States, and the United States to Spain) and be interconnected to the SEACOM cable system. Network development will be staged with the Africa and Americas portions of the system targeted to be available in the first quarter of 2014 and with the Europe portion to follow.

Decommissioned Cable Systems

Background

Legislation and licensing

The South African government passed the Electronic Communications Act in 2006 and is dramatically restructuring the sector towards a converged framework, converting vertically-integrated licenses previously granted to public switched telephone network (PSTN), mobile, underserved area licenses (USAL), PTN and value-added network service (VANS) operators into new Electronic Communications Network Services (ECNS), Electronic Communications Services (ECS), or broadcasting licenses.  In January 2009, the ICASA granted ECS and ECNS licenses to over 500 VANS operators.

The South African market is in the process of being dramatically restructured, moving away from old-style, vertically integrated segments under the 1996 Telecommunications Act and 2001 Telecommunications Amendment Act towards horizontal service layers, and the new-style licensing regime is being converted to accommodate this.  This process involves the conversion of pre-existing licenses into new "individual" or "class" ECNS, ECS, or broadcasting licenses.  Licenses are also required for radio frequency spectrum, except for very low power devices.

ICASA granted ECNS licenses during December 2007 to seven new USAL operators.  The new licensees include PlatiTel, Ilembe Communications, Metsweding Telex, Dinaka Telecoms, Mitjodi Telecoms, and Nyakatho Telecoms.

The South African market is split into two main tiers: top-tier Internet access providers; and downstream retail ISPs.  ISPs are licensed as VANS providers, although under the Electronic Communications Act of 2006, these licenses were converted in January 2009 to individual or class electronic communication service (ECS) licenses.  All domestic ISPs gain international connectivity through one of the Internet access providers: SAIX (Telkom), Neotel, Verizon Business, Internet Solutions (IS), MTN Network Solutions, DataPro, and Posix Systems.

Following the deregulation of the VANS industry in South Africa, a number of leading operators have diversified from being a top-tier ISP to becoming a converged communications service provider offering a range of voice and data services, particularly VoIP, through the conversion of VANS licenses into ECS licenses.

With delays to local loop unbundling (LLU), which would give ISPs access to exchanges, operators are deploying a range of broadband wireless networks.  While the mobile operators are deploying HSDPA, W-CDMA and EDGE networks and entering the broadband space, operators are also deploying WiMAX, iBurst, and CDMA systems.  Telkom, Sentech, Neotel, WBS and the under-serviced areas licensees (USALs) have currently been given commercial WiMAX licenses.  Telkom launched full commercial WiMAX services in June 2007, first at 14 sites in Pretoria, Cape Town and Durban, and a further 57 sites rolled out over 2007/8.  Another 10 operators, including M-Web and Vodacom, were granted temporary test licenses and are awaiting spectrum to be allocated by ICASA. In May 2008, WBS partnered with Vodacom and Intel Corporation to roll out an 802.16e WiMAX network.

SANReN 
The South African National Research and Education Network (SANReN) provides dedicated bandwidth capacity to more than a 100 university campuses, research institutes, museums and scientific organisations in South Africa. This is the foundation for collaborative research with academics and scientists on the African continent and across continents. The SANReN enables the participation of South African scientists and postgraduate students in global research, such as the high energy physics ATLAS experiment hosted at CERN in Geneva, and will enable global access to the Square Kilometre Array radio astronomy project co-hosted in South Africa and Australia.

Internet censorship

Internet censorship in South Africa is not individually classified by the OpenNet Initiative (ONI), but South Africa is included in ONI's regional overview for sub-Saharan Africa.

Digital media freedom is generally respected in South Africa. Political content is not censored, and neither bloggers nor content creators are targeted for their online activities. In 2013, Freedom House rated South Africa's "Internet Freedom Status" as "Free".

In September 2012, the Constitutional Court upheld a ruling that prescreening publications (including Internet content) as required by the 2009 amendments to the Films and Publications Act of 1996 was an unconstitutional limitation on freedom of expression.

In 2006, the government of South Africa began prohibiting sites hosted in the country from displaying X18 (explicitly sexual) and XXX content (including child pornography and depictions of violent sexual acts); site owners who refuse to comply are punishable under the Film and Publications Act.

Under the Electronic Communications and Transactions Act of 2002 (ECTA), ISPs are required to respond to and implement take-down notices regarding illegal content such as child pornography, defamatory material, and copyright violations. Members of the Internet Service Providers Association are not liable for third-party content they do not create or select, however, they can lose this protection from liability if they do not respond to take-down requests. ISPs often err on the side of caution by taking down content to avoid litigation since there is no incentive for providers to defend the rights of the original content creator, even if they believe the take-down notice was requested in bad faith. There is no existing appeal mechanism for content creators or providers.

South Africa participates in regional efforts to combat cybercrime. The East African Community (consisting of Kenya, Tanzania, and Uganda) and the Southern African Development Community (SADC; consisting of Malawi, Mozambique, South Africa, Zambia, and Zimbabwe) have both enacted plans to standardise cybercrime laws throughout their regions.

See also

Internet in Africa
Digital Divide in South Africa
Internet censorship in South Africa
Telecommunications in South Africa
National broadband plans from around the world
List of international submarine communications cables

References

External links
The New Wave: Who connects to the Internet in South Africa, how they connect and what they do when they connect,  a 2012 report by Indra de Lanerolle, design by Garage East, University of Witwatersrand.
 "South Africa country report", Freedom on the Net, Freedom House, 2013.
 South African Internet laws.
 Internet Service Providers' Association, a voluntary South African Internet industry body not for gain.
 Namespace ZA, an organisation formed to represent the South African Internet community on issues pertaining to the .ZA domain.

 
Telecommunications in South Africa
Mobile phone companies of South Africa